Jayaraman Gowrishankar (born 1956) is an Indian medical   microbiologist. Gowrishankar received his M.B.B.S. degree from the Christian Medical College, Vellore. He holds Doctor of philosophy in bacterial genetics from the University of Melbourne.

He was a Scientist and Group Leader at the Centre for Cellular and Molecular Biology in Hyderabad.  
In 2000, he was positioned as director for Centre for DNA Fingerprinting and Diagnostics. Currently, he is the director of the Indian Institute of Science Education and Research, Mohali.

He was awarded in 1991, the Shanti Swarup Bhatnagar Prize for Science and Technology, the highest science award in India,  in the Biological sciences category. He was awarded in 2013, the Padma Shri, India's fourth highest civilian honour, for his contribution towards the field of science.

Civilian Honours
Padma Shri in 2013 by the Government of India.

Research Awards
INSA Medal for Young Scientists, 1986
CSIR Young Scientist Award, 1987
BM Birla Prize. 1991
Shanti Swarup Bhatnagar Prize for Science and Technology for 1991
JC Bose Fellowship, 2007
The 2012 Moselio Schaechter Distinguished Service Award - American Society for Microbiology

Research highlights
Discovery of the operon and its exquisite osmotic regulation
Enunciation of a new hypothesis that toxic RNA-DNA hybrids (R-loops) are prone to occur from nascent untranslated transcripts in E coli.

References

Living people
Recipients of the Shanti Swarup Bhatnagar Award in Biological Science
1956 births
Scientists from Chennai
Indian microbiologists
Recipients of the Padma Shri in science & engineering
20th-century Indian biologists